Paradais (originally titled Páradais in Spanish) is a novel by Mexican author Fernanda Melchor. It was published in its original Spanish in 2021 by Literatura Random House. An English translation by Sophie Hughes was published in 2022 by Fitzcarraldo Editions and New Direction Books.

Benjamin P. Russell of the Houston Chronicle described the novel as a "commentary on" the "often haunting facts" of Mexico, stating "a more incisive commentary [...] would be hard to find."

This was the second Melchor novel to receive an officially published English translation.

Contents
The setting is the gated community Paradais, located in the state of Veracruz. The novel is about a teenage duo, Franco Andrade and Leopoldo "Polo" García Chaparro,  who do criminal activity together.

Characters
Franco, who lives in Paradais, has the nickname "fatboy". Franco is from a wealthy family, has little social success. Franco wants to have intercourse but has not found a willing female partner. Gabriella Martin of Harvard Review wrote that Franco is "Exhibiting all the qualities of a classic “incel,”[...]" Franco's father is a lawyer. Franco has a sexual obsession with Señora Marián. 

Polo is from a low socioeconomic background and works at Paradise by gardening. Polo, who did not graduate from senior high school, is 16 years old. Justin Torres of The New York Times compared Polo to Bigger Thomas.

Señora Marián is married to a television host and has two children. She lives adjacent to Franco.

Reception
Justin Torres of The New York Times stated that the work is "seductive" despite the "unbroken wall of text" that makes a "visual effect", and he praised the work of the translator for showing "vitality of the prose".
The English translation of the novel was longlisted for the 2022 International Booker Prize.

See also
 Hurricane Season - A novel by Melchor

References

Further reading

External links
 Paradais - New Direction Books

2021 novels
Mexican novels
Random House books
Novels set in Mexico